Badjiri is an extinct Aboriginal Australian language once spoken by the Badjiri people of southern Queensland. Bowern suspects it's a Maric language. Bowern (2001) said the data was too sketchy to be sure, but Bowern (2011) assigned it to Maric without comment.

References 

Dixon, R. M. W. 2002. Australian Languages: Their Nature and Development. Cambridge University Press

External links 
 Bibliography of Badjiri language and people resources, at the Australian Institute of Aboriginal and Torres Strait Islander Studies
Maric languages